Please Marry My Boy is an Australian reality television series which premiered on the Seven Network on 30 January 2012. The show is hosted by Ada Nicodemou and produced by Granada Australia. The first series concluded on 2 April 2013.

The series was renewed for a second season which premiered on 29 July 2013 at 9:00pm.

Format 

In each episode, four mothers are given the task of finding their sons a female romantic partner which the son cannot seemingly find themselves. Together, the mothers and their respective sons meet ten women. The mothers will then select their top three candidates. The chosen females are later given the unexpected news; that they are moving in with the son and his mother.

Episodes

Season 1 (2012)

Season 2 (2013)

References

External links
Facebook page
Official site

2012 Australian television series debuts
2013 Australian television series endings
Seven Network original programming
English-language television shows
Australian dating and relationship reality television series
Television series by ITV Studios